Brendon Daniels, is a South African actor. He is best known for the roles in the television serials Vallei van Sluiers, Die Francois Toerien and Die Boland Moorde, as well as films Four Corners, Zulu and I Now Pronounce You Black and White.

Career
He has starred in several serials in South African television such as Interrogation Room, Madam & Eve, Stellenbosch, Shooting Stars, Transito, Geraldina die Tweede, The Philanthropist and League of Glory. In the serial Trackers, he played the role of a crime writer 'Deon Meyer'.

Meanwhile, Daniels also acted in the films: The Young Lions, Heaven, Dollars and White Pipes, End of the Road, Fleisch, Master Harold and the Boys, I Now Pronounce You Black and White, The Abyss Boys, Agter die Berge, Black Butterflies, Four Corners, Zulu and iNumber Number.

Apart from television and cinema, he also featured in many stage plays such as Die Generaal. Rooiland, Babbel and Lot. In 2012 he won the award for the Best Actor for his role in Rooiland at KKNK and kykNET Fiesta Awards. Then he acted in the plays, Kho Khoi to Toi Toi, Ladies Night, Bacchus of die Boland, The Joseph and Mary Affair, Om Soos 'n Lyk te Le, Anthony and Cleopatra, Snuf in die Neus and Skollies.

In 2013, he was invited to act in the kykNET crime anthology series Die Boland Moorde where he played a lead role of Adjudant-offisier 'Shane Williams'. In the same year, he acted in the blockbuster Four Corners in which he plays 'Farakha'. The film received critical acclaim and later awarded  at several international film festivals.

Filmography

References

External links
 
 Brendon Daniels career

Living people
1974 births